The Greater Milwaukee Open was a regular golf tournament in Wisconsin on the PGA Tour. For 42 years, it was played annually in the Milwaukee area, the final sixteen editions in the north suburb of Brown Deer at the Brown Deer Park Golf Course. U.S. Bancorp was the main sponsor of the tournament in its final years and the last purse in 2009 was $4 million, with a winner's share of $720,000. The event was run by Milwaukee Golf Charities, Inc., with proceeds going to a variety of Wisconsin charities.

History
The tournament debuted in 1968 as the Greater Milwaukee Open (or GMO), competing against the British Open by offering a $200,000 purse (second highest on the Tour) with a $40,000 first prize.  Lee Trevino, the recent U.S. Open winner, chose to play in the more lucrative GMO instead of the 1968 British Open.

Art Wall Jr., the  champion, won in 1975 at age 51 for his first tour win in nine years, his fourteenth and final win on the tour. Wall was one stroke ahead of 27-year-old runner-up Gary McCord, later a noted golf commentator, but winless in his career on the PGA Tour.

In 2004, U.S. Bank signed on as title sponsor. In July 2006, U.S. Bank and Milwaukee Golf Charities Inc. announced that U.S. Bank will remain the sponsor for at least three more years.

The tournament was played at four courses in the Milwaukee area:

It was nationally televised beginning in 1989, and Tiger Woods made his professional debut in 1996 at Brown Deer with a 67 on August 29, four days after winning his third consecutive U.S. Amateur title in Oregon. At age 20, he made the cut and tied for 60th place, earning a modest $2,544.

The event ended when U.S. Bank announced that it would not renew its sponsorship after the 2009 event. Secondary sponsor Aurora Health Care also announced that it would substantially cut back on its financial involvement. Before U.S. Bank's sponsorship, the tournament survived thanks to the help of late philanthropist Jane Pettit. Its slot on the PGA Tour schedule against the British Open, along with low attendance and TV ratings, were reasons cited by U.S. Bank for pulling out of the event. The Greater Milwaukee Charities organization has closed its offices and has shut down.

Tournament highlights
 1968: Dave Stockton wins the first Greater Milwaukee Open despite twice striking spectators with his drives in the final round. He beats Sam Snead by four shots.
 1969: Ken Still shoots a final round 65 to beat Gary Player by two strokes. The win all but clinches Still a spot on the Ryder Cup team.
 1970: Deane Beman makes the most of his withdrawal from the Open Championship to play in Milwaukee instead. He beats Don Massengale, Ted Hayes, and Richard Crawford by three shots.
 1974: Ed Sneed is the tournament's first wire-to-wire winner. He beats Grier Jones by 4 shots.
 1975: 51-year-old Art Wall Jr. beats Gary McCord by one shot.
 1978: Lee Elder defeats Lee Trevino on the 8th hole of a sudden death playoff.
 1979: Black golfer Calvin Peete, who did not take up golf until he was 23 years old, wins for the first time on the PGA Tour. He shoots a final round 65 to beat Jim Simons, Lee Trevino, and Victor Regalado by five shots.
 1982: Calvin Peete wins at Milwaukee and on the PGA Tour for the second time and in almost carbon copy fashion from his 1979 win. He finishes two strokes ahead of Victor Regalado who was also runner-up in 1979.
 1985: Jack Nicklaus competes in Milwaukee for the first time as a professional.  He finishes second, three strokes behind winner Jim Thorpe.
 1986: Corey Pavin wins in Milwaukee for the first time. He birdies the 4th hole of a sudden death playoff to defeat Dave Barr.
 1989: Greg Norman competes in Milwaukee for the first time. He beats Andy Bean by 3 shots.
 1993: Billy Mayfair holes a 20-foot chip shot on the fourth hole of a three-way sudden death playoff to defeat Mark Calcavecchia and earn his first PGA Tour title. Ted Schulz had dropped out on the first playoff hole after making bogey.
 1996: Tiger Woods makes his professional debut at the age of 20 four days after winning his third consecutive U.S. Amateur title. He shoots -7 for the tournament (67-69-73-68), including his first-ever hole-in-one as a professional on the 14th hole during his final round, to finish tied for 60th and earn $2,544.
 1997: Loren Roberts attempt to become the first Greater Milwaukee Open champion to defend his title is foiled when Scott Hoch sinks a 60-foot chip shot for eagle on the 72nd hole to beat Roberts and David Sutherland by one shot.
 1999: Carlos Franco wins for the second time in his rookie season on the PGA Tour. He beats Tom Lehman by two shots.
 2003: Kenny Perry birdies the 72nd hole to win by one shot over Stephen Allan and Heath Slocum.
 2006: Corey Pavin sets a 9-hole PGA Tour scoring record, 26, on his way to a first round 61. Pavin, who had first won in Milwaukee in 1986, goes on to win the tournament for a second time, beating Jerry Kelly by two shots.
 2009: Bo Van Pelt wins the final edition of the tournament. He defeats John Mallinger on the second hole of a sudden death playoff.

Winners

Note: Green highlight indicates scoring records.

Multiple winners
Eight men won the GMO more than once, but none more than twice.
 2 wins: Dave Stockton (1968, 1973), Dave Eichelberger (1971, 1977), Calvin Peete (1979, 1982), Scott Hoch (1995, 1997), Loren Roberts (1996, 2000), Jeff Sluman (1998, 2002), Carlos Franco (1999, 2004), and Corey Pavin (1986, 2006)

See also
 Other former PGA Tour events in Milwaukee
 Milwaukee Open, 1940
 Blue Ribbon Open, 1951
 Milwaukee Open Invitational, 1955–61

References

External links
 Official website
 PGATOUR.com Tournament website

Former PGA Tour events
Golf in Wisconsin
Sports in Milwaukee
Recurring sporting events established in 1968
Recurring sporting events disestablished in 2009
1968 establishments in Wisconsin
2009 disestablishments in Wisconsin
Defunct sports competitions in the United States